File 09812 is a conceptual and performative work of critical and biographical content by artist Abel Azcona. The artist shows, in an art installation and documentary way, his Social Welfare file, fully exposed in various occasions. These documents speak of a child in a situation of total abandonment, with visible signs of abuse, neglect and malnutrition, and testimonies from neighbors and the environment are provided confirming that the child could be left for weeks in total solitude in the apartment, which did not meet the minimum habitability conditions. The documentary installation is accompanied by a performative reading of each of the pages of the file by Abel Azcona himself. The artwork was responsible for inaugurating the International Contemporary Art Fair of the Mediterranean. The work was part of the retrospective exhibition dedicated to the artist by the city of Pamplona in 2015.

See also 

 Performance Art
 Installation
 Endurance art

References

Performances